Meas Kheng (born 28 March 1946) is a Cambodian sprinter. She competed in the women's 100 metres at the 1972 Summer Olympics. She was the first woman to represent Cambodia at the Olympics.

She was dubbed as the "sprint queen" of Southeast Asia in the early seventies.

At seventeen, Kheng was a finalist in the 400 metres at the 1963 GANEFO in Jakarta. Her time of 62.1 seconds still stands as the Cambodian junior record.

On July 19, 1968 in Phnom Penh, Meas Kheng clocked 12.0 seconds to set the current Cambodian 100-metre hand-timed record.

At the 1971 SEAP Games, Kheng breasted the tape in 12.3 seconds in the 100 metres and in a national record of 25.05 seconds in the 200 metres to clinch the gold medal in both events. Her time of 25.1 seconds slashed 0.3 seconds off the previous championship record. She was beaten into second place by Malaysia's Junaidah Aman in the 400 metres, clocking 58.1 seconds.

Confusion exists about Kheng's best times, and little news of her would emerge. On the eve of the 1973 SEAP Games, it was reported that Kheng's season bests were 12.0 seconds over 100 metres, 25.4 seconds over 200 metres, and 54.3 seconds over 400 metres. But on the eve of the Games debut, the Khmer team's chef de mission emphasised his athletes' unpreparedness as a result of the ongoing civil war, and claimed Kheng's season bests were 12.6 for the 100 metres, 25.1 seconds for the 200 metres, and 57.6 seconds for the 400 metres. Said Kheng: "I am very bad this time. No time for training. I fight in war". Still, coming as the clear favourite into the 1973 Southeast Asian Peninsular Games, Kheng was tipped for a gold treble. However, she pulled a muscle in the 100-metre final and withdrew from the competition.

References

External links
 

1946 births
Living people
Athletes (track and field) at the 1972 Summer Olympics
Cambodian female sprinters
Olympic athletes of Cambodia
Place of birth missing (living people)
Olympic female sprinters
Southeast Asian Games medalists in athletics
Southeast Asian Games gold medalists for Cambodia
Competitors at the 1971 Southeast Asian Peninsular Games